Marleyella is a genus of righteye flounders native to the western Indian Ocean where found at depths ranging from the shallows to more than .

Species
There are currently two recognized species in this genus:
 Marleyella bicolorata (von Bonde, 1922) (Comb flounder)
 Marleyella maldivensis Norman, 1939

References 

Pleuronectidae
Marine fish genera
 
 
Taxa named by Henry Weed Fowler